The St Paul Baronetcy, of Snarford was a title in the Baronetage of England. It was created in 1611 for George St Paul but became extinct on his death in 1613.

The St Paul Baronetcy, of Ewart Park, was a title in the Baronetage of the United Kingdom. It was created on 17 November 1813 for Horace St Paul, Member of Parliament for Bridport. The second baronet was member of parliament for Worcestershire East and served as High Sheriff of Northumberland in 1851. The title became extinct on his death in 1891.

The family seat was Ewart Park near Berwick on Tweed, Northumberland.

St Paul baronets, of Snarford (1611)

 Sir George St Paul, 1st Baronet

St Paul baronets, of Ewart Park (1813)
 Sir Horace David Cholwell St Paul, 1st Baronet (1775–1840)
 Sir Horace St Paul, 2nd Baronet (1812–1891)

References

 

 

Extinct baronetcies in the Baronetage of England
Extinct baronetcies in the Baronetage of the United Kingdom